Grindstone Creek is a stream in Clinton, DeKalb and Daviess counties in the U.S. state of Missouri. It is a tributary of the Grand River.

The stream flows northeast through southeastern DeKalb County past the community of Fordham and passing under Missouri Route 6 1.5 miles east of Weatherby. It enters Daviess County approximately three miles northeast of Weatherby and flows north crossing under Missouri Route E one half mile west of Santa Rosa.

Grindstone Creek was named for the fact grindstones were sourced from quarries along its course.

See also
List of rivers of Missouri

References

Rivers of Clinton County, Missouri
Rivers of DeKalb County, Missouri
Rivers of Daviess County, Missouri
Rivers of Missouri